Rinku may refer to:

In characters:
Rinku (The Legend of Zelda) or Link, the main character in The Legend of Zelda media
Rinku (YuYu Hakusho), a character in YuYu Hakusho media

In sports:
Rinku (athlete), Indian para javelin thrower
Rinku Moni, see India women's national football team
Rinku Singh (wrestler), Indian professional wrestler
In geography:
Rinku Gate Tower Building, a 57-storey building Rinku Town completed in August 1996
Rinku Town, a commercial development in Osaka, Japan, adjacent to Kansai International Airport

See also
Riku (disambiguation)